Trades Increase was an English merchant ship launched in 1609 and lost three years later.

References

Ships of the United Kingdom
1612 endings
1609 beginnings